Corsiaceae is a family of monocotyledonous flowering plants. The APG II system (2003) treats the family in the order Liliales, in the clade monocots. This is a slight change from the APG system, of 1998, which left the family unplaced as to order, but did assign it also to the monocots.

Taxonomy

The family is usually taken to include three genera, Corsia, Corsiopsis, and Arachnitis with a total of 27 known species. As the members of this family are achlorophyllous non-autotrophic herbs (i.e. they are not green, and do not photosynthesize) they have sometimes been included in the family Burmanniaceae which, however, according to APG II is not even in the same order. The APG companion site cites a reference which suggests the family should consist of Corsia only, with Arachnitis better placed nearer to family Burmanniaceae. Corsiopsis, like Arachnitis a monotypic genus, has been described recently.

Genera and species

Arachnitis Phil., 1864
Arachnitis uniflora
Corsia Becc., 1877
Corsia acuminata
Corsia arfakensis
Corsia boridiensis
Corsia brassii
Corsia clypeata
Corsia cordata
Corsia cornuta
Corsia crenata
Corsia cyclopensis
Corsia dispar
Corsia haianjensis
Corsia huonensis
Corsia lamellata
Corsia merimantaensis
Corsia ornata
Corsia papuana
Corsia purpurata
Corsia pyramidata
Corsia resiensis
Corsia torricellensis
Corsia triceratops
Corsia unguiculata
Corsia viridopurpurea
Corsia wiakabui
Corsia wubungu
Corsiopsis D.X.Zhang, R.M.K.Saunders & C.M.Hu, 1999
Corsiopsis chinensis

References

Bibliography

External links
 links at CSDL, Texas

 
Liliales families
Parasitic plants
Taxa named by Odoardo Beccari